Local elections were held in 22 localities in Malta on 10 March 2007. The last round of elections held in 2004, on the same day of the national election for the Maltese Members for the European Parliament (MEPs). Approximately 68% of the eligible voters turned up on election day. With the locality of Safi with the highest percentage (86%); and the locality of Swieqi with the lowest percentage (53%). The largest locality was that of Mosta and the smallest one was that of San Lawrenz, Gozo.

Turnout

Results

The Malta Labour Party (MLP) has won the Local Councils Elections with 53% of first count votes. The Partit Nazzjonalista (PN) obtained 44% while Alternativa Demokratika (AD) and independent candidates obtained 3%. The councillors elected consist of 74 councilors with MLP; 63 councillors with PN; 2 councillors with AD; and 1 councillor on the locality of Floriana, that consist with the group known as 'Floriana L-Ewwel' (Floriana First).

Results table

Results by Locality

References 

2007
Malta
Local council elections
March 2007 events in Europe